Bandarban Sadar is an upazila of Bandarban District in the Division of Chittagong, Bangladesh.

Geography
It has a total area of 501.99 km2.

Demographics

According to the 2011 Bangladesh census, Bandarban Sadar Upazila had 18,934 households and a population of 88,282, 46.9% of whom lived in urban areas. 10.6% of the population was under the age of 5. The literacy rate (age 7 and over) was 49.3%, compared to the national average of 51.8%.

Administration
Bandarban Sadar Upazila is divided into Bandarban  Municipality and five union parishads: Bandarban, Kuhalong, Rajbila, Suwalak, and Tankabati. The union parishads are subdivided into 16 mauzas and 225 villages.

Bandarban Municipality is subdivided into 9 wards and 69 mahallas.

See also
Upazilas of Bangladesh
Districts of Bangladesh
Divisions of Bangladesh

References

Upazilas of Bandarban District